Maxim Yevgenyevich Katz (born 23 December 1984) is a Russian political and public figure, co-founder of the Urban Projects Foundation, author of the YouTube channel of the same name, Russian champion in sports poker, former deputy of the municipal assembly of the Moscow district Schukino (III convocation 2012–2016) from Party "Yabloko".

Biography 
Maxim Katz was born in Moscow, but at the age of eight his family moved to Israel. He lived in Givatayim with his parents and attended the David Ben-Gurion school nearby. Katz returned to Russia at the age of 17.

In 2014, Maxim Katz was accused of having Israeli citizenship, which would ban him from participating in elections in Russia. However, his electoral headquarters' head denied it. Later, Yevgeni Fyodorov, member of the State duma, complained of the same case to the Investigative Committee of Russia asking to institute criminal proceedings, but the case was not opened.

In 2019 and 2021, Maxim Katz visited Israel and shot videos for his YouTube channel about his school and the country.

In an interview, Katz claimed that he did not have experience of military service. In 2012, in an interview with the Komsomolskaya Pravda radio station, he said that he studied at three Russian universities, but did not graduate from them. Instead, Katz went to urban planners in Denmark and the United States to take private lessons at his own expense.

After arriving in Russia, Maxim Katz played poker in Moscow casinos and won the WSOP in the No-Limit Hold’em category. In 2007, he became the champion of Russia in sports poker.

In 2016, Katz was among 13 Russians who received a Chevening Scholarship from the UK government. The scholarship allows students with leadership skills in various fields to study at a British university master's program. Katz enrolled in graduate studies at the University of Glasgow at the Department of Social and Political Sciences with a degree in Urban Management and Public Policy. According to Katz, he is fluent in Russian, Hebrew and English.

On 6 May 2020, he married Ekaterina Patulina (CEO of "Author's Media" LLC).

Maxim Katz opposes the 2022 Russian invasion of Ukraine.

Political activity 

During his travels to various cities of the world, Katz became interested in the problems of urban planning and in October 2011 he studied at the company of Jan Gehl, which is engaged in urban design.

Wanting to put into practice his views on the development of the city, Maxim Katz decided to engage in political activities and, as the start of his political career, took part in the election of deputies of the municipal assembly of WMO Schukino from the "Yabloko" party. Katz’s election campaign won the attention of many media outlets and social networks. During the 4 March 2012 vote, Katz took fourth place, which ensured him the post of deputy in the municipal assembly.

Maxim Katz took part in protests against election fraud and was one of the speakers at the rally on 10 March 2012. In October 2012, he was elected to the Opposition Coordination Council. On 27 May 2013, he announced his withdrawal from the Coordination Council.

In October 2013, he announced his readiness to run for deputies of the Moscow City Duma in 2014. After a three-week collection of 5850 signatures, he was registered as a candidate in the 5th constituency (Schukino, Khoroshevo-Mnevniki districts, Filevsky park). The campaign was funded entirely by donations from private individuals, conducted with the participation of more than 300 agitators. However, he failed to win the elections of 14 September 2014. Katz calls the reason for the loss a low turnout and lack of support from the Yabloko party.

Campaign Management 
In 2012, he was the head of the election headquarters of Ilya Varlamov in the election of the mayor of Omsk.

In 2013 - Deputy Head of the electoral headquarters of Alexei Navalny in the mayoral election in Moscow. After the election, the head of the electoral headquarters, Leonid Volkov, praised Katz’s work, calling him “the genius of the organization of processes.” Three years after the campaign, Leonid Volkov said that Katz had been dismissed from headquarters a week before the election due to threats to contact law enforcement in the event of unlawful actions by staff. According to Katz, there was no dismissal. According to Ilya Varlamov’s statements, the dismissal attempt was due to Katz’s personal conflict with Chief of Staff Leonid Volkov, but Navalny did not support the attempt to dismiss.

In May 2016, Alexey Navalny, negatively assessing Katz and the experience of working with him, ruled out the possibility of any further interaction and cooperation. Soon after, Yekaterina Patulina, the former head of the Internet department of Navalny’s headquarters, spoke about the conflict between Katz and Volkov, claiming that the real cause of the conflict was sexual harassment of her by Leonid Volkov.

In 2015, Katz joined the federal council of the "Civil Initiative" party and headed the party’s campaign headquarters for elections to the Kaluga Regional Duma.

In 2016, he headed the election headquarters of the State Duma deputy of the VI convocation Dmitry Gudkov, who in the 18 September elections to the State Duma was nominated for the Tushino constituency from the Yabloko party. During the election campaign, he created an online platform for conducting the election campaign, which won the "Pollie award" in the nomination “Digital / internet - foreign language”. The campaign was also awarded the "International - best in Show" award.

In March 2017, Maxim Katz, together with Dmitry Gudkov, launched the United Democrats project, designed to elect democratically minded Muscovites as municipal deputies in the September elections. The site, created by Katz and Gudkov, helped candidates register, collect signatures, join teams, print campaign materials, and collect money for election accounts. A total of 3,500 people applied for participation in this project as candidates for deputies, but only those candidates who expressed clear democratic and opposition positions and negative attitude to the incumbent president Vladimir Putin received assistance. A total of 999 people were nominated, as a result of which 267 became deputies.

Of the 266 deputies supported by the United Democrats project, 177 were nominated by the Yabloko party, making the party the second in the city in terms of the number of deputy mandates. Commenting on the election results for the party, leader Grigory Yavlinsky called Katz “an effective ally” and noted the youth’s interest in the elections. Later, in January 2018, Dmitry Gudkov broke off cooperation with Katz due to disagreements regarding the Yabloko part.

In 2019, Maxim Katz participated in the leadership of election campaigns in the Moscow City Duma of Daria Besedina and Anastasia Bryukhanova, employees of City projects. Daria Besedina was registered, her team raised more than 18 million rubles through fundraising, Daria was supported by a "Smart Voting" of Alexei Navalny and was able to win the election, becoming a deputy of the Moscow City Duma.

Participation in the Yabloko Party 
On 12 September 2016, Katz announced his intention to join the Yabloko party. In a video published on this topic, Katz said that his statement was accepted by Grigory Yavlinsky, and urged his supporters to join the Yabloko party and announced his intention to be elected in the future to the regional council of the branch and to the post of chairman of the Moscow branch of Yabloko. Later in September 2016, Maxim Katz was accepted into the party at a meeting of the Federal Bureau.

After the appeal of Maxim Katz, at least 328 people submitted applications for joining the party. These actions provoked a negative reaction from the current chairman of the Moscow branch of the party, Sergei Mitrokhin, who called what was happening "a raider seizure." As a result, more than 110 people were denied admission to the party because of “political independence”. Later, these people were accepted into the party by the federal bureau, and Sergei Mitrokhin was removed from the post of chairman of the Moscow branch.

On 1 December 2018, Katz was elected chairman of the local branch of the Yabloko party in the North-Western District of Moscow. In 2019, he headed the headquarters of Yabloko in the elections in St. Petersburg. As a result of the campaign, 99 representatives of the party became municipal deputies (previously the party had 0 municipal deputies in St. Petersburg).

On 11 February 2020, information appeared about the dissatisfaction of Maxim Katz's supporters with the procedures adopted by the Yabloko party for the election of the party’s governing bodies, as well as about the possible soon expulsion of Katz from the Yabloko party. Further, this information was refuted by the head of the Moscow branch of the Yabloko Sergey Ivanenko.

On 21 February 2020, Katz was again expelled from the Yabloko party along with 15 of his supporters by decision of the Federal Bureau. After this, Katz announced plans to create an urban faction in Yabloko and the intention to lead the party in the future.

Awards 
In March 2021, the Center for Belarusian Solidarity awarded Katz the Global Belarusian Solidarity Award in the category "View from the outside".

References 

1984 births
Living people
Yabloko politicians
Russian bloggers
Russian YouTubers
Russian people of Jewish descent
Russian expatriates in Israel
Russian activists against the 2022 Russian invasion of Ukraine
People listed in Russia as foreign agents